Fruit Roll-Ups is a brand of fruit snack that debuted in grocery stores across America in 1983.  It is a flat, pectin-based, fruit-flavored snack rolled into a tube, spread on a backing sheet of cellophane to prevent the product from sticking to itself.

Fruit Roll-Ups are manufactured by General Mills and distributed under the Betty Crocker brand in the American market and under the Uncle Tobys brand in Australia. Several similar products have been marketed by General Mills and by other companies, notably under the Kellogg's brand in the UK as Fruit Winders.

Advertising 
Fruit Corners Fruit Roll-Ups were heavily marketed on television in America throughout the early 1980s. Most spots featured the tag line "Fruit Corners Fruit Roll-Ups: Real fruit and fun, rolled up in one."  Later spots featured children innovating in the "Fruit Roll-Up Fun Factory".

The overall marketing theme is that parents can feed their children "fun" processed foods that are based on real fruit.  Studies of American mothers have shown that the mothers are surprised at how sweet Fruit Roll-Ups are and how little fruit is present in them.  For example, the strawberry flavor contains no strawberries, and the only ingredient derived from fruit is concentrated pear juice.

History 
General Mills' research for the product began in 1975.

Joray Fruit Rolls are a round, fruit leather product from New York that predates Fruit Roll-Ups. Fruit Roll-Ups have a more rubbery texture than the natural rolls and though were originally round in shape, they are now shaped like a parallelogram.

Fruit Roll-Ups have featured variants on the original plain sheets such as punch out shapes on the rolls and temporary tattoos for tongues and formerly on skin.

 Berry Lemonade/Cherry Slushie
Crazy Pix Cool Chix Berry Wave
Crazy Pix Wild Ones Blastin' Berry
Electric Blue Raspberry
Flavor Wave

Betty Crocker sells Fruit Roll-Ups in single-flavor boxes and flavor variety packs.

Ingredients 

The main ingredient is sugar, and Fruit Roll-Ups contain five different types of sugar:  sugar from pear juice concentrate, corn syrup, dried corn syrup, sugar, and a small amount of dextrose.  They also contain small amounts of partially hydrogenated cottonseed oil, citric acid, sodium citrate, acetylated monoglycerides, fruit pectin, malic acid, ascorbic acid, natural flavors, and artificial colors.

Lawsuit over health claims 
In 2011, the Center for Science in the Public Interest sued General Mills over Fruit Roll-Ups, saying that their packaging and marketing was misleading because it presented the product as a nutritious, healthful, fruit-filled snack, despite having approximately the same nutritional profile as gummy bear candies.  The lawsuit was settled out of court with General Mills agreeing not to put pictures of fruits on the labels, unless that fruit was actually present in that flavor of the Fruit Roll-Up, and to either stop claiming that the product is "made with real fruit", or to include in that potentially misleading statement the percentage of the Fruit Roll-Up that is made from real fruit.  These changes took place in 2014.

See also 
Fruit by the Foot
Black sesame roll
Fruit Gushers
Sunkist Fun Fruits

References 

5. https://www.snackhistory.com/fruit-roll-ups/#History_Of_Fruit_Roll_Ups

External links 
New York Times
General Mills brand history
Fruit Corners brand history (General Mills) - Archive.org mirror

Brand name confectionery
General Mills brands
Products introduced in 1983